Adult Contemporary is a chart published by Billboard ranking the top-performing songs in the United States in the adult contemporary music (AC) market.  In 1994, eight songs topped the chart, then published under the title Hot Adult Contemporary, based on weekly airplay data from radio stations compiled by Nielsen Broadcast Data Systems.

At the start of the year, Michael Bolton was at number one with "Said I Loved You...But I Lied", retaining a position which the song had occupied at the end of 1993.  The song remained at number one through the issue of Billboard dated February 19 for a final total of 12 weeks atop the chart, tying the record for the longest unbroken run at number one on the AC listing set by the song which it had displaced from the top spot, "The River of Dreams" by Billy Joel.  The longest run at number one to take place wholly during 1994 was achieved by Richard Marx with his song "Now and Forever", which came one week short of the record, spending 11 consecutive weeks in the top spot.  As no artist had more than one chart-topper during the year, Marx thus also spent the highest number of weeks at number one of any act during the year.

Two consecutive chart-toppers in the summer came from film soundtracks.  In the issue of Billboard dated June 11 Madonna reached number one with the song "I'll Remember", from the soundtrack of the comedy-drama film With Honors.  After four weeks in the top spot it was displaced by "Can You Feel the Love Tonight" by Elton John, as featured in the animated film The Lion King.  John's song won both the Academy Award for Best Original Song and the Golden Globe Award for Best Original Song as well as the Grammy Award for Best Male Pop Vocal Performance.  The year's final number one was "I'll Make Love to You" by R&B group Boyz II Men, which held the top spot for the final two weeks of 1994.  The track also reached the top spot on the Hot R&B Singles listing, and was one of two of 1994's AC number ones to also top Billboards all-genre chart, the Hot 100, the other being Celine Dion's cover version of Jennifer Rush's 1984 song "The Power of Love".

Chart history

References

See also
1994 in music
List of artists who reached number one on the U.S. Adult Contemporary chart

1994
1994 record charts
1994 in American music